John Lewis Sherrill (August 2, 1923, Covington, Tennessee - December 2, 2017) and Elizabeth "Tib" Sherrill (born February 14, 1928, Hollywood, California) are Christian writers. They have co-authored a number of best-selling books, including:
God's Smuggler with Brother Andrew
The Hiding Place with Corrie ten Boom
The Cross and the Switchblade with David Wilkerson

From 1944 to 1951 John Sherrill was a freelance writer in Europe. John Sherrill and Elizabeth Schindler met aboard a ship on their way to Europe and were married in Geneva, Switzerland in December 1947. From 1947 to 1963 Elizabeth was a freelance writer for magazines. In 1970 they founded a publishing company, Chosen Books, dedicated to searching "the world for books that would have two criteria.  They would be interesting.  They would be helpful." Their first title was The Hiding Place.

Elizabeth has authored more than 30 books - many co-written with her husband. Some of these books have been translated into more than 40 languages.

Elizabeth Sherrill has three children: John Scott Sherrill, Donn Sherrill, and Elizabeth Flint.   She resides in Hingham, Massachusetts.  John Sherrill died on December 2, 2017, aged 94.

Bibliography

 Elizabeth Sherrill, All the Way to Heaven: A Surprising Faith Journey, Revell, 2002.
 John L. Sherrill, They Speak With Other Tongues, Chosen Books, 1999. (originally published 1964)

References

 My Friend, The Bible by John Sherrill 1978 Chosen Books, p. 126

External links
 http://www.elizabethsherrill.com - Elizabeth Sherrill's Website

Christian writers
Married couples
American spiritual writers
People from Chappaqua, New York